Die on Your Feet is an Australian television comedy series premiering on One on 7 August 2014.  The eight-part series follows the story of five fictional stand-up comedians trying to make a go of it in the Melbourne International Comedy Festival. The main characters are played by five real life stand-up comedians, and debuted at the real MICF. Throughout the show, real Australian comedians are name-dropped, and real Australian comedians make cameo appearances as themselves.

The series was created by Greg Fleet, directed by Ted Robinson and is based on a 2005 play. It was filmed in 2010, with some of it even being shot during an actual MICF gala, but due to issues with the show being picked up, it did not air until 2014.

Plot 
Five comedians and flatmates figure out their shows and relationships during a run of the Melbourne International Comedy Festival. Brian Ibsen (Hills) and Sophie Glass (Grant) are antagonistic ex-partners whose separation has not yet been made public. O.J. (Brough) and J.J. (Gates) also have recently separated from each other professionally, having been a well-established comedy duo. They all rally together to help O.J. figure out his show and gala spot, as well as promote him, all of which he is reluctant to do.

Cast
 Greg Fleet as Bob Graffoe, an older comedian
 Adam Hills as Brian Ibsen, Sophie's cocky and unfaithful ex-boyfriend
 Alan Brough as O.J. (other James) Wilson, an edgy comedian who requires the help of his flatmates to get his show off the ground
 Corinne Grant as Sophie Glass, Brian's ex-girlfriend and an alcoholic
 Steven Gates as J.J. James, a former children's TV star

Supporting and guest cast
 Claire Hooper as Jenny Cline
 Dave Thornton as Gareth
 Harley Breen as fan
 Alex Papps as himself
 Lawrence Mooney as Mulligan
 Dave Graney as radio host
 Justin Hamilton as photographer
 Paul McDermott as himself
 Josh Thomas as himself
 Bill Hunter as himself

See also
List of Australian television series

References

External links

Die On Your Feet official website

10 Bold original programming
2014 Australian television series debuts
Australian comedy television series